Madeleine Scott (born 11 February 1993) is an Australian Paralympic swimmer and has won silver medals at the 2015 IPC Swimming World Championships, 2014 Commonwealth Games and the 2016 Rio Paralympics.

Personal
Scott was born on 11 February 1993 in Perth, Western Australia. She has erb's palsy. In 2016, she was studying to be dental nurse.

Career
Scott began swimming at the age of 13 for the South Lake Dolphins club in Perth. In 2010, she broke the world record S9 50m butterfly, beating the world record by three tenths of a second, touching in at a time of 32.26.
She experienced success at the 2014 Commonwealth games achieving silver in the 100m breastroke SB9 classification. Scott also finished 4th in the 200m individual medley in the SM10 classification. Scott broke the world record S9 50m butterfly beating the world record by three tenths of a second touching in at a time of 32.26.

At the 2015 IPC Swimming World Championships in Glasgow, Scotland, she won a silver medal in the Women's 4 × 100 m Medley Relay 34 Points, finished fourth in the Women's 100m Breaststroke SB9 and sixth in the 100m Butterfly S9 and 200m Individual Medley SM9.

At the 2016 Rio Paralympic Games, Scott won her first Paralympic silver medal in the Women's  Relay Medley (34 Points) alongside Ellie Cole, Maddison Elliott and Lakeisha Patterson. SHe also competed in the following events but didn't progress to the finals: Women's 100m Butterfly S9, Women's 100m Breaststroke SB9, Women's 200m Individual Medley SM9.

In 2015, she was training at the Australian Institute of Sport under head coach Yuriy Vdovychenko.

Recognition
2009 – Wheelchair Sports Western Australia Junior Athlete of the Year

References

External links
 
 
 

Female Paralympic swimmers of Australia
1993 births
Living people
Sportswomen from Western Australia
Swimmers at the 2016 Summer Paralympics
Paralympic silver medalists for Australia
Medalists at the 2016 Summer Paralympics
S9-classified Paralympic swimmers
Commonwealth Games bronze medallists for Australia
Commonwealth Games silver medallists for Australia
Commonwealth Games medallists in swimming
Swimmers at the 2014 Commonwealth Games
Swimmers at the 2018 Commonwealth Games
Medalists at the World Para Swimming Championships
Paralympic medalists in swimming
Australian female breaststroke swimmers
21st-century Australian women
Medallists at the 2014 Commonwealth Games
Medallists at the 2018 Commonwealth Games